Juncus prismatocarpus, the branching rush, is a tufted, perennial species of flowering plant in the rush family, Juncaceae. Found in moist situations, often on sandy ground. Grass-like leaves are 10 to 40 cm long, 1.3 to 3.0 mm in diameter. Growing in many parts of Australia, New Zealand and south east Asia. The specific epithet is derived from Latin, meaning prism shaped fruit.

Due to its flattened unifacial leaves lacking adaxial identity, Juncus prismatocarpus has been used to study leaf development and faciality.

References

prismatocarpus
Plants described in 1810
Flora of New South Wales
Flora of Victoria (Australia)
Flora of South Australia
Flora of Queensland
Flora of Tasmania
Flora of New Zealand
Flora of China
Flora of Japan